Rhogogaster chlorosoma is a species of sawflies in the family Tenthredinidae.

Description
It is one of the various green sawflies with a variable black pattern, but in this sawfly the black markings on the top of the abdomen are absent or quite reduced. Like other sawflies, this species lack the slender "wasp-waist" between the thorax and abdomen.

Similar species are Rhogogaster viridis, that shows evident black marks on the upper surface of the abdomen and Rhogogaster punctulata, bearing black dots along the sides of the abdominal segments.

Adults can mostly be encountered from May through July. They mainly feed on pollen and nectar of Heracleum sphondylium as well as small insects. The nocturnal larvae are polyphagous, feeding on the leaves of a variety of woody and herbaceous plants, mainly Sorbus, Quercus robur, Salix, Corylus avellana, Stellaria, Filipendula ulmaria, Alnus glutinosa, Rubus and Populus.

Distribution
It is widespread in most of Europe.

Habitat
This species prefers hedgerows and vegetated mountain areas.

References
 Biolib
 Fauna Europaea
 Bioinfo
 Database of Insects and their Food Plants

External links
 Nature Spot
 Commanster

Tenthredinidae
Insects described in 1943